α-N-acetylglucosaminidase (α-acetylglucosaminidase, N-acetyl-α-D-glucosaminidase, N-acetyl-α-glucosaminidase, α-D-2-acetamido-2-deoxyglucosidase) is a protein associated with Sanfilippo syndrome. It is an enzyme with systematic name α-N-acetyl-D-glucosaminide N-acetylglucosaminohydrolase. This enzyme catalyses the following chemical reaction

 Hydrolysis of terminal non-reducing N-acetyl-D-glucosamine residues in N-acetyl-α-D-glucosaminides

This enzyme hydrolyses UDP-N-acetylglucosamine.

References

External links 
 

EC 3.2.1